Richard Gonzalez is the name of:

Richard Gonzales (tennis), American tennis player also known as 'Pancho Gonzales'
Richard Gonzales (table tennis), Filipino tennis player
Richard González (footballer), Uruguayan footballer also known as 'Martín González'